Ophrestia is a genus of flowering plants in the legume family, Fabaceae. It belongs to the subfamily Faboideae. At least six species have been described from Zambia.

References 

Phaseoleae
Fabaceae genera